Maatschappelijke Voetbal Vereniging Maastricht, commonly known as MVV Maastricht or simply as MVV, is a Dutch professional football club from the city of Maastricht. Founded on 2 April 1902, MVV Maastricht currently compete in the Eerste Divisie, the second tier of Dutch football.

Because their crest is based on the city's coat of arms, an armed angel holding a red shield with a white star, they are nicknamed de Sterrendragers ("Wearers of Stars") and, in local dialect, Us MVV'ke ("our little MVV"). The club's name was formerly Maastrichtse Voetbal Vereniging until 2011, when it was officially changed to include the city name after "MVV."

History

The early years (1902–1946)
In 1902, in an establishment on the famous Vrijthof square, plans were made to found a Maastricht football team. It started with the name MVC (Maastricht Football Club), but they changed its name often during their first years. It was not until 1908 that their current name MVV (Maastrichtse Voetbal Vereniging) was adopted. From the start in 1902 until 1976 MVV played continuously in the highest Dutch leagues. Periods of top rankings were varied with periods of anonymity. In the 1926–27 season they lost out the Dutch championship by losing a decisive match against SC Enschede. In 1932 they ranked second again, behind champions PSV. The 1935–36, 1938–39 and 1945–46 seasons were also successful, with two second-place finishes. In 1946–47 the team even won their league and was to participate in the champions group. This group was made up of the four champions of each region. Like in 1927, MVV had no success and finished last.

During that period some MVV players were selected for the Dutch national team. A remarkable achievement, given the fact that the KNVB (Dutch Football Association) mostly selected players from teams in the "Randstad", Bèr Felix, Sjo Soons and Jeu van Bun were selected for the national team.

Post-war MVV (1952–1969)
1952 was an important year for the team. MVV celebrated its 50th anniversary and the call to establish professional football in the Netherlands became louder. In the 1954–55 season the official KNVB and the professional football organisation (NBVB), supported by the newly founded professional teams, put their differences aside and a semi-professional league was born. In the new competition (Eredivisie) the top nine teams of the NBVB and the KNVB leagues were to participate. MVV came in third and was allowed entry in the new league.

During the 1950s and 1960s MVV had some good seasons and Fons van Wissen, Giel Haenen and Gerard Bergholtz were selected for the national team. In 1957 the Boschpoort stadium was expanded to 18,000 seats due to increasing popularity.
In 1961 the club moved to the new De Geusselt ground. The popularity of the club led to a total of 100,000 fans passing the stadium entry in the 1969 season. In 1963 the club was given 14 golden stars by a committee of supporters celebrating the period of 50 years in the highest divisions. Since then, the team wore occasionally imitation golden stars, instead of the white star from the city of Maastricht weapon. The sixties were a mixed period of glory and struggling against relegation with no numerous achievements.

The golden years (1970–1974)
Times changed when MVV bought a young player from neighbouring third division team Chevremont. Willy Brokamp had an impressive stay there and his debut in the Eredivisie was at age 18. He led the team to some top rankings in the early 1970s and in 1973 he was even voted best player in the Eredivisie and became top scorer. During that period the team arguably played their best football in history. In 11 seasons with MVV Brokamp scored 141 goals. While playing for MVV, he played six times (for six goals) in the national team. Due to a conflict with MVV, who lacked his unprofessional and laid-back attitude, he moved on to Ajax.

His former team-mate and current TV analyst, Johan Derksen, said the following about him: "He never did a warming-up, because then he would be dead-tired before the match began. In a game against Excelsior he pulled his shirt over his head and did not participate in the game any more, because he was ashamed by the performance of the team. At that time, they travelled by intercity train when playing an away-game. When he overslept, the station chief would hold up the train and waited for Brokamp to arrive."

The yo-yo years (1974–2010)

In 1976 MVV was relegated to the second division (Eerste Divisie). A disastrous season without Brokamp, who had moved to AFC Ajax in 1974, led to the first relegation in their history. The first year in the second division ended with a third-place finish and the team just missed out on promotion. The second year they finished second and the team won promotion via the promotion/relegation play-offs.
In 1980 they beat Ajax in a historic match by 3–6. Still the biggest home-defeat in the old De Meer Stadium for the Amsterdam squad. After some years of mid-table finishes the team was relegated again in 1982.

In 1984 they won the second division, only to be relegated in 1986 for the third time in a short period of time. After earning a promotion in 1988, they were back in the Eredivisie. MVV finally managed to avoid the drop and remained in the highest division until 1995.
During that period strikers Cees Schapendonk and Erik Meijer played their caps for the national team and defender Erik Gerets was selected for the Belgium national football team.
In the 1991–92 and 1992–93 seasons the team finished seventh for two years in a row, nearly achieving European football.
In 1992, MVV was voted Team of the Year" by the KNVB, mostly because of their attacking playing style, implemented by coach Sef Vergoossen.

Surprisingly, the 1995 season ended with another relegation. Once again it took the team two years to taste first division football again. A young and talented squad, led by coach and former MVV goalkeeper Frans Körver, won the second division again in 1997. Almost 50,000 fans celebrated this achievement on the market square.
Yet the fifth relegation followed in 2000, forcing the renowned team to celebrate their 100th anniversary in the second division. Breaking with the tradition of promoting after two seasons, MVV even came in 18th in the 2004 season. Their poorest season in history. Currently, the club is still in the second division and occupying a 10th position on the all-time Eredivisie list.

In 2008, it was proposed to merge the Limburgish clubs MVV, Roda JC Kerkrade, VVV-Venlo and Fortuna Sittard to create a new club called FC Limburg. The merger was however cancelled after the province Limburg denied its backing of the project.

A new beginning (2010–present)
After years of financial troubles, MVV was classified by the KNVB as 'financially healthy' (category 3) at the beginning of the 2011–12 season. This was unique, because never before had a club from category 1 ('insufficient') been promoted directly to category 3 of the financial health list. In the KNVB assessment of 2018, MVV Maastricht had dropped to category 2 ('sufficient').

At the beginning of the 2010–11 season, the club changed its name from 'Maastrichtse Voetbal Vereniging' to 'Maatschappelijke Voetbal Vereniging Maastricht' ("Social Football Club Maastricht") and the club logo and the board also changed. The KNVB had imposed a penalty on the club because of the financial problems in 2010, which meant that the club had to start the competition with an eight-point deduction. Yet, they finished in 10th place; above expectations. MVV would once again reach the promotion play-offs in 2011, 2012 and 2012–13 season, but the club stranded in the first round three years in a row due to elimination by FC Volendam, SC Cambuur and again FC Volendam, respectively.

Led by head coach René Trost, who was working in his third and final season in Maastricht, the club competed for the championship in the 2012–13 season from the onset. MVV immediately became period champions of the 1st period, then became Herbstmeister and also retained championship ambitions for large parts of the second half of the season. Due to the bankruptcies of AGOVV and Veendam, however, in accordance with the rules of the KNVB, the results played against those clubs were cancelled. At that point, MVV had played against those clubs three times and won three times, meaning MVV had to hand in nine points. Ultimately, MVV ended in fifth place, eleven points behind eventual winners SC Cambuur.

MVV managed to reach the promotion play-offs in 2015–16 and 2016–17. In the play-offs in 2015–16, MVV eliminated FC Volendam in the first round, but were eliminated in the second round by De Graafschap. In the play-offs of 2016–17, MVV managed to reach the final. MVV, who had entered in the second round, defeated Cambuur on their way. In the finals, MVV lost on aggregate to local rivals Roda JC Kerkrade who therefore retained their position in the Eredivisie. The first match was marked by unrest and rioting supporters, and was therefore suspended for 30 minutes.

Support and rivalries
MVV has always been known in the Netherlands as a team with very passionate fans. In the eighties and early nineties, MVV had a notorious hardcore fan base called the Angel Side. The name chosen because of Maastricht's city coat of arms, which features an angel, they were infamous for causing trouble and rioting on numerous occasions throughout the country. Today the group still exists but is weakened by anti-hooliganism legislation and the poor achievements of the team.

The dramatic sportive and financial situation of the team led to some serious incidents. In 2003 when fans gathered around the town hall to listen to the debate over a municipal loan for MVV, eventually leading to riots. Mayor Leers decided that the city of Maastricht should not support MVV financially anymore and bankruptcy was minutes away. Bricks and bottles were thrown at the town hall and groups of people tried to force their way in the building. Aldermen, council members and riot police were attacked, when they tried to leave the town hall. This also led to a massive pitch invasion at the last game of the season.

During the years the fans also protested heavily against a merger with arch-rivals Roda JC Kerkrade and Fortuna Sittard. This led to another pitch invasion and death threats to club directors.

Aside from the rivalries with Roda JC and Fortuna Sittard, MVV also share rivalries with Helmond Sport, VVV Venlo and NEC Nijmegen. Roda JC-MVV is considered the main rivalry in the Dutch Province of Limburg by both sets of supporters, despite a long period without the two sides playing in the beginning of the millennium, with the two sets of hardcore support regularly clashing and players making the switch between the two clubs receiving death threats. Roda JC are considered by Maastricht supporters as one having a Germanic and Limburgish identity, with German flags present in the Kerkrade-based club's stand and the Limburgish anthem being played at every home game. Maastricht on the other hand is known for its distinct Latin, Burgundian identity compared to the rest of the Province.

Ownership and finances
For a time MVV had a reputation as a well-paying team, where older players and former stars could end their career for a substantial compensation. In 1946 MVV even tried to lure the legendary striker Faas Wilkes to Maastricht. They offered two Bedford trucks to the Wilkes' family transport corporation for him and his brother Leen. They both accepted. But in a time where football was only played on amateur basis in the Netherlands, the KNVB discovered the transaction and threatened to ban Wilkes for a long time. So Faas Wilkes and his brother stayed with their team Xerxes in Rotterdam. A few years later he moved to Internazionale to become one of the first professional football players from the Netherlands. The KNVB banned him for nearly five years.

In 1983, under the reign of VVD MP Max Tripels, the club got into a financial abyss. The debt was 4.5 million guilders. Tripels asked horse and construction billionaire Léon Melchior to reorganise the finances. In cooperation with others, Melchior started a project for a new stadium and in 1986 the municipal government gave the Geusselt ground to MVV. They even gave the team 3.7 million for the new stadium. But when Melchior started making ambitious plans and wanted to invest heavily in MVV, he was forced out by an old boys network, who had ruled MVV for a long time. The old stadium was renovated but a new one never came.

In 1993, the team was hit with another blow. The FIOD (Fiscal Police) raided the offices of MVV and arrested chairman Karl Dittrich, director Ron Weijzen and former chairman Bert Lieben. The reason for the arrests were the claims made by former financial administrator Marcel Koenen, who was arrested for stealing from the bank accounts of MVV. The directors were accused of bribe, tax fraud and forgery. Dittrich admitted that talks were held over bribing FC Utrecht after the match and the FIOD found a curious flow of funds but charges were dropped because the evidence was not sufficient. The claims of forgery and tax fraud stood and Dittrich settled the case.

In 2001, just before their 100th anniversary in 2002, disaster struck again. The financial situation was bad and bankruptcy was only minutes away. The question was again whether MVV would celebrate their 100th anniversary. Yet again, MVV management decided to go to the municipal government. With arguments such as "the bankruptcy of the Sport7 channel caused the bad financial situation" and "MVV is very important to the people of Maastricht" etc. they were able to convince mayor Houben and the aldermen. So eventually they managed to keep the club alive for 2002. MVV had a debt of 1.5 million euros and the last solution was to go to the municipal government again, for the second time within only a couple of years. But this time, in April 2003, they refused. According to newly appointed mayor Leers, "the town could not grant MVV yet another loan because the citizens would not accept it." However, thousands of people gathered around the town hall to protest the intentions of the municipal government. Later, just in time, billionaire Léon Melchior saved the club again by paying off its debts. Currently, the club has reorganised their finances and is building on a solid financial basis.

Stadium

In the early days MVV changed grounds often, starting by playing promotional games on the Vrijthof square. They moved to a cycling track on the edge of the city, before finally creating their own ground at the Boschpoort location. The stadium was given the same name. It is claimed that the first MVV players themselves raised the pasture to create a playable pitch. Later on stands were built, improved and enlarged during various periods in time.

In January 1962 they moved to their current ground at the Geusselt terrain. Again, the name of the location also became the name of the stadium. The Geusselt was restructured at different occasions. In a first major reconstruction the athletic track was removed, the pitch was turned 90 degrees and newly built seat-only stands reduced the capacity of the ground. In the new millennium the open corners of the stadium were closed and the last stand-only stand was replaced by a seat-only stand. Currently the stadium has a capacity of approximately 10,000.

Honours
 Eerste Divisie
 Winner: 1984, 1997
 Promoted to Eredivisie
 Promotion: 1978, 1988
 UEFA Intertoto Cup
 Winner: 1970

Results

Below is a table with MVV's domestic results since the introduction of professional football in 1956.

Players

Current squad

Club Officials

Managerial history

 Bill Julian (1932–34)
 Viktor Havlicek (1948–56)
 Friedrich Donnenfeld (1966–68)
 George Knobel (1969–73)
 Maarten Vink (1973)
 Leo Canjels (1973–75)
 André Maas (1975–76)
 George Knobel (1976–78)
 Leo Steegman (1978–81)
 Cor van der Hart (1980–81)
 Friedel Rausch (1982–83)
 Jo Bonfrere (1983)
 Clemens Westerhof (1983–84)
 Barry Hughes (1984–85)
 Jo Bonfrere (1985)
 Cor Brom (1985)
 Pim van de Meent (1985–86)
 Frans Körver (1986–89)
 Sef Vergoossen (1989–95)
 Jan Reker (1995–95)
 Frans Körver (1995–98)
 Wim Koevermans (1998–2000)
 Roger Reijners (2000–02)
 Ron Elsen (2002–03) (caretaker)
 Jan van Deinsen (2003–04)
 Rob Delahaye (2004) (caretaker)
 Andries Jonker (2004–06)
 Jurrie Koolhof (2006–07)
 Ron Elsen (2007) (caretaker)
 Rob Delahaye (2007) (caretaker)
 Robert Maaskant (2007–08)
 Fuat Çapa (2008–10)
 Paul Meulenberg (2010) (caretaker)
 Ron Elsen (2010) (caretaker)
 René Trost (2010–13)
 Tiny Ruys (2013)
 Edwin Hermans / Ron Elsen (2013–14)
 Ron Elsen (2014–19)
 Fuat Usta (2019–20)
 Darije Kalezić (2020–21)
 Klaas Wels (2021–2022)
 Maurice Verberne (2022–present)

References

External links
 Official site
 Eredivisie ranking
 MVV-Schotland fansite

 
Football clubs in the Netherlands
Football clubs in Maastricht
Association football clubs established in 1902
1902 establishments in the Netherlands
South Limburg (Netherlands)